Johnson Lane is a census-designated place (CDP) in the south side of the Carson City metropolitan area in Douglas County, Nevada, United States. Its population was 6,490 at the 2010 census.

Geography
Johnson Lane is located at  (39.037535, -119.729971).

Demographics

As of the census of 2000, there were 4,837 people, 1,786 households, and 1,496 families residing in the CDP. The racial makeup of the CDP was 95.29% White, 0.12% African American, 0.76% Native American, 0.91% Asian, 0.08% Pacific Islander, 0.64% from other races, and 2.19% from two or more races. Hispanic or Latino of any race were 4.38% of the population.

There were 1,786 households, out of which 33.5% had children under the age of 18 living with them, 75.1% were married couples living together, 5.3% had a female householder with no husband present, and 16.2% were non-families. 11.5% of all households were made up of individuals, and 3.1% had someone living alone who was 65 years of age or older. The average household size was 2.71 and the average family size was 2.91.

In the CDP, the population was spread out, with 24.5% under the age of 18, 4.7% from 18 to 24, 25.6% from 25 to 44, 32.1% from 45 to 64, and 13.0% who were 65 years of age or older. The median age was 43 years. For every 100 females, there were 99.7 males. For every 100 females age 18 and over, there were 99.6 males.

The median income for a household in the CDP was $59,130, and the median income for a family was $60,918. Males had a median income of $46,329 versus $29,907 for females. The per capita income for the CDP was $24,247. About 4.3% of families and 6.1% of the population were below the poverty line, including 6.9% of those under age 18 and 5.1% of those age 65 or over.

References

Census-designated places in Douglas County, Nevada
Census-designated places in Nevada